Heat shock factor 1 (HSF1) is a protein that in humans is encoded by the HSF1 gene. HSF1 is highly conserved in eukaryotes and is the primary mediator of transcriptional responses to proteotoxic stress with important roles in non-stress regulation such as development and metabolism.

Structure 
Human HSF1 consists of several domains which regulate its binding and activity.

DNA-Binding Domain (DBD) 
This N-terminal domain of approximately 100 amino acids is the most highly conserved region in the HSF protein family and consists of a helix-turn-helix loop. The DBD of each HSF1 monomer recognizes the sequence nGAAn on target DNA. Repeated sequences of the nGAAn pentamer constitute heat shock elements (HSEs) for active HSF1 trimers to bind.

Oligomerization Domain (Leucine Zipper Domains) 
The two regions responsible for oligomerization between HSF1 monomers are leucine zipper (LZ) domains 1-3 and 4 (these regions are also commonly referred to as HR-A/B and HR-C). LZ1-3 is situated just downstream of the DBD while LZ4 is located between the RD and the C-terminal TAD. Under non-stress conditions, spontaneous HSF1 activation is negatively regulated by the interaction between LZ1-3 and LZ4. When induced by stress, the LZ1-3 region breaks away from the LZ4 region and forms a trimer with other HSF1 LZ1-3 domains to form a triple coiled-coil.

Regulatory Domain (RD) 
The structures of the C-terminal RD and TAD of HSF1 have not been clearly resolved due to their dynamic nature. However, it is known that the RD is situated between the two regions of the oligomerization domain. The RD has been shown to regulate the TAD through negative control by repressing TAD in the absence of stress, a role that is inducibly regulated through posttranslational modifications.

Trans-Activation Domain (TAD) 
This C-terminal region spans the last 150 amino acids of the HSF1 protein and contains 2 TADs (TAD1 and TAD2). TAD1, which sits at amino acids 401-420, is largely hydrophobic and is predicted to take on an alpha-helical conformation. TAD1 has been shown to directly interact with target DNA to direct HSF1's transcriptional activation. The structure of TAD2, amino acids 431-529, is not expected to be helical as it contains proline residues in addition to hydrophobic and acidic ones. The function of the HSF1 TAD is still largely uncharacterized, but Hsp70 has been shown to bind with this domain, which could describe the mechanism by which Hsp70 negatively regulates HSF1.

Function 

The HSF1 protein regulates the heat shock response (HSR) pathway in humans by acting as the major transcription factor for heat shock proteins. The HSR plays a protective role by ensuring proper folding and distribution of proteins within cells. This pathway is induced by not only temperature stress, but also by a variety of other stressors such as hypoxic conditions and exposure to contaminants. HSF1 transactivates genes for many cytoprotective proteins involved in heat shock, DNA damage repair, and metabolism. This illustrates the versatile role of HSF1 in not only the heat shock response, but also in aging and diseases.

Mechanism of action 

Under non-stress conditions, HSF1 exists primarily as an inactive monomer located throughout the nucleus and the cytoplasm. In its monomeric form, HSF1 activation is repressed by interaction with chaperones such as heat shock proteins Hsp70 and Hsp90, and TRiC/CCT. In the event of proteotoxic stress such as heat shock, these chaperones are released from HSF1 to perform their protein-folding roles; simultaneously, the export of HSF1 to the cytoplasm is inhibited. These actions allow HSF1 to trimerize and accumulate in the nucleus to stimulate transcription of target genes.

Clinical significance 

HSF1 is a promising drug target in cancer and proteopathy.

The genes activated by HSF1 under heat shock conditions have been recently shown to differ from those activated in malignant cancer cells, and this cancer-specific HSF1 panel of genes has indicated poor prognosis in breast cancer. The ability of cancer cells to use HSF1 in a unique manner gives this protein significant clinical implications for therapies and prognoses.

In the case of protein-folding diseases such as Huntington's disease (HD), however, induction of the heat shock response pathway would prove beneficial. In recent years, using cells that express the poly-glutamine expansion found in HD, it has been shown that both the HSR and HSF1 levels are reduced after heat shock. This reduced ability of diseased cells to respond to stress helps to explain the toxicity associated with certain diseases.

Interactions 

HSF1 has been shown to interact with:

CEBPB, HSF2, HSPA1A, HSPA4, Heat shock protein 90kDa alpha (cytosolic) member A1, NCOA6, RALBP1  and SYMPK.

See also 
 Heat shock factor
 Heat shock protein
 Transcription factor

References

Further reading

External links 
 

Transcription factors